Amir Hendeh may refer to:
 Amir Hendeh, Dehshal
 Amir Hendeh, Kisom